Sarcochilus serrulatus, commonly known as the banded butterfly orchid, is an epiphytic orchid endemic to tropical North Queensland. It has up to six crowded leaves with finely toothed and wavy edges and up to ten reddish brown flowers with a white, yellow-banded labellum.

Description
The leaves are oblong to egg-shaped with wavy edges that have fine teeth. The petals are shorter and narrower than the lateral sepals. Flowering occurs between August and January.

Taxonomy and naming
Sarcochilus serrulatus was first formally described in 1972 by David Jones and the description was published in The Victorian Naturalist. The specific epithet (serrulatus) is derived from the Latin word serra meaning "toothed like a saw".

Distribution and habitat
The banded butterfly orchid grows on trees in dense rainforest, usually near streams. It is only known from the Tablelands Region of north Queensland.

References

Endemic orchids of Australia
Orchids of Queensland
Plants described in 1972
serrulatus